Republic of China Armoured Vehicle Development Center is a military designer and manufacturer in Taiwan which has been a supplier armoured vehicles for the Republic of China Army and Republic of China Marine Corps.

The center was formed in 1980 in a partnership with General Dynamics in the development of the CM-11 Brave Tiger tank.

Products

The development center's products have been licensed version of military hardware from the United States.

 CM-12 Tank
 CM-11 Brave Tiger
 CM-21 Armored Vehicle
 CM-22 Mortar Carrier
 CM-23 Mortar Carrier
 CM-24 Ammo Carrier
 CM-25 TOW Launcher
 CM-26 Command Track

See also

 Lungteh Shipbuilding
 CSBC Corporation, Taiwan
 National Chung-Shan Institute of Science and Technology
 Aerospace Industrial Development Corporation

References

Defence companies of Taiwan
Military of the Republic of China
1980 establishments in Taiwan